Sofía Sánchez (born 23 August 1989) is an Argentine synchronized swimmer.

Sofía competed in the women's duet at the 2012 Summer Olympics with her twin sister Etel and finished in 22nd place. She also competed at the 2016 Summer Olympics with her sister and finished in 19th place. She and Etel were born as a set of triplets with their brother Thomas who plays volleyball.

References 

1989 births
Living people
Argentine synchronized swimmers
Olympic synchronized swimmers of Argentina
Synchronized swimmers at the 2012 Summer Olympics
Synchronized swimmers at the 2016 Summer Olympics
Synchronized swimmers at the 2015 Pan American Games
Synchronized swimmers at the 2011 Pan American Games
Twin sportspeople
Triplets
South American Games bronze medalists for Argentina
South American Games medalists in synchronized swimming
Competitors at the 2010 South American Games
Pan American Games competitors for Argentina
Sportspeople from Rosario, Santa Fe